Blackhall Rocks was one of two railway stations to have served the Blackhalls in County Durham, North East England, and was a stop on the Durham Coast Line. The station was poorly sited for the village that grew around Blackhall Colliery in the years following its opening and, after the opening of the more conveniently sited Blackhall Colliery station in 1936, it came to primarily serve the more southerly village of Blackhall Rocks.

History 

In July 1907, the NER added a station to serve the Blackhalls at what would become Blackhall Rocks. The first station was likely sited here as the sinking of Blackhall Colliery would not begin until 1909 and thus, at the time, it was anticipated that the station would primarily be used by tourists visiting the caves at Blackhall Rocks. This meant that the village that developed to serve the colliery was left some distance from their nearest railway station. Between the summer and 1 October 1919, the station was only served on Wednesdays and Saturdays.

Although this meant that the station ceased to primarily serve that village, a community had begun to grow close to Blackhall Rocks station during the 1920s, making it not entirely redundant. LNER lines in the North East came under the control of the North Eastern Region of British Railways following its nationalisation in 1948. By this time, passenger and goods traffic across the country was in decline and this was the case for Blackhall station, which closed to passengers on 4 January 1960 and then to all traffic on 7 December 1960.

Passenger services continue to pass through the site of the station, but the only station between Seaham and Hartlepool to have been reopened (as of 2021) is at Horden.

References

External links 

Disused railway stations in County Durham
Former North Eastern Railway (UK) stations
Railway stations in Great Britain opened in 1907
Railway stations in Great Britain closed in 1960
1907 establishments in England
1964 disestablishments in England